Towers of London are an English punk rock band, who formed in 2004. Their music mixes elements of rock and glam metal music with 1977 style British punk. The band have divided the opinions of the British music press since their emergence in early 2004, gaining positive reviews from some music news media and extremely negative reviews from others.

History
In 2003, a band was formed named 'The Tourettes', featuring Dirk and Donny Tourette (real names Francis and Patrick Brannan); the brothers had been playing together in rock bands since secondary school. The Tourettes played in a glam punk style, which has been described as "a post Manic Street Preachers rock 'n' roll rush".

Blood, Sweat and Towers
The band signed to New York independent record label TVT Records in early 2005. Whilst on TVT, they released a string of singles; "On A Noose", "Fuck It Up", "How Rude She Was", "Air Guitar" and "I'm A Rat".

In mid-2005, Towers of London performed at two festivals in the United Kingdom: Reading and Leeds Festivals and Download Festival. The band's performance was received well, but due to fighting backstage after another group allegedly stole their property, they are now banned from returning to the Download Festival. Lead singer Donny Tourette was brought before Cambridge Magistrates Court in June 2005, for criminal damage during a show at Cambridge Anglia Ruskin University in February 2005. He was ordered to pay £775 of compensation, court costs and fines.

In June 2006, Towers of London released their debut album Blood, Sweat and Towers. It was produced by Stacy Jones and Bill Lefler. The album featured thirteen tracks, including the five singles they had released to date.

TV series and support dates
In the spring of 2006, the band travelled to New York City to join The Pogues as support for their annual U.S. Saint Patrick Day shows, at the Best Buy Theater in Times Square. The band also opened for Guns N' Roses on two of their 2006 summer UK tour dates, Dirk commented; "Guns N' Roses? What more can you say? We're going to have it this weekend!". During the summer of 2006 the band played on the main stage at the Reading and Leeds Festivals. Bravo TV aired a ten-part TV series about the band, after camera crews followed them for around for a year. The show, named simply The Towers of London, featured footage of various performances including the 2005 Download Festival which saw them banned from the event. Various clips have already been released on the internet, one which shows members of the band assaulting a member of the public after being provoked. The show launched on  19 October.

Dirk Tourette had an altercation with the American band My Chemical Romance, in which he allegedly threw a lit cigarette at the band's drummer Bob Bryar at their in-store performance. Members of the band, who attended because of "free booze", got into a scuffle with My Chemical Romance's tour managers.

In October 2006, Towers of London supported the New York Dolls, on three of their UK tour dates in London, Liverpool and Glasgow. The band then released their fifth Single, "I'm A Rat", on 12 February 2007.

Donny Tourette joined Celebrity Big Brother 5 on 3 January 2007, at the start of the series. He left the show after just 48 hours by scaling a wall to escape.

Following this, he also appeared on the comedy panel game show Never Mind the Buzzcocks. During the episode, Tourette was the target of repeated jibes from host Simon Amstell. At one point he grabbed his crotch and said to Amstell, "This is what I think of you" to which Amstell replied "You think me a small penis?". Later, in an attempt to be controversial, Tourette began smoking. "Oh my God!", Amstell declared, "Donny is smoking! A cigarette you can legally buy in shops!". Tourette was branded "as punk as Enya" after losing his temper when the results were read out (Tourette's team had lost).

The band proceeded with a full tour of the United Kingdom in support of the "I'm a Rat" single. Towers of London had a lucky escape in February 2007, after a group of teenagers targeted the band with breeze blocks. The five-piece were chatting to a group of fans after a gig outside York Fibbers when the incident happened. One of the teenagers was caught and handed over to the police.

Rev and Snell leave – New album
On 13 July, it was revealed by NME that The Rev and Snell had left the band because they believed 'their future is not with the band'. However, Towers of London would continue their tour throughout July, drafting in friends Kristian Marr and Aaron Attwood to fill the positions.

The band then retreated to prepare their second album, releasing four songs called "The Bible", "The Towers Waltz", "Naked On The Dancefloor" and "Start the Rupt" on their MySpace page. Towers of London auditioned for a new drummer and lead guitar player, meeting such musicians as Ben Taylor, (who went on to drum for the Towers at their comeback gig in Harlow), Julian Molinero from Medusa and guitarist Tom Earl (formerly of the hard rock groups Rope & Widow and Swallow This).

Former members Rev and Snell played with the electronic group The Prodigy as part of their live band throughout 2007. More recently, they formed a punk outfit, DAY 21, with Jimmy Pursey and bassist Mat Sargent from Sham 69.

The Rev went on to play with The Howling, before leaving that group and becoming the lead guitarist for the live incarnation of Ginger Wildheart's Hey! Hello! project.

Snell went on to play for The Loyalties, with Tom Spencer (ex-The Yo-Yos), Rich Jones (ex-The Black Halos, Amen, Alec Empire, Ginger Wildheart Band, Michael Monroe) and Lee Jones (ex-Deadline). In 2019, Snell joined Medusa as their new drummer and recorded the album 'In Bed with Medusa' at Electrical Audio, Chicago with engineer Steve Albini.

Fizzy Pop
On 6 June 2008, the band played a comeback gig at Club Quattroz in Harlow, Essex. They used James Phillips (guitar) and auditionee Ben Taylor (drums) for the gig. The set consisted of four songs from their debut album, and a variety of brand new songs. A few months later, the band updated their MySpace with a selection of dates for mid October 2008, where a mini-tour would occur to coincide with their new album, Fizzy Pop (released 29 September). For this, the band dropped Taylor on drums, and took on another school friend.

"Go Sister, Go", a track from the album, was released as a single in early 2009.

2009 events and 'Back to Basics' Tour
In January 2009, the band were scheduled to tour Europe again, starting with a warm-up at the Queens Hotel in Weymouth. However, after only a brief stint in Europe, the band fell silent in May that year. In September 2009, Towers of London posted dates for a 'Back to Basics' tour. An acoustic set with Donny and Dirk Tourette was arranged for their first gig in early October. However, their next scheduled appearance at Rockfest was cancelled, due to problems beyond the band's control.

Present
13 years on from their debut album, Blood Sweat & Towers, the Towers Of London reformed with the original line up with promise of a new album, which was planned to have been released in 2019.

In 2019, a documentary film titled "Towers of London: the Movie" was announced. It has since been renamed "F**K IT UP!". It was set for its premiere in April 2022 at the Hot Docs Film Festival in Toronto but before the screening, the film was withdrawn for undisclosed reasons and all screenings were cancelled, including online. 
In October 2022 it was announced that the documentary would have its European Premiere at the Doc n Roll Festival in London in November 2022.

Band members
Donny Tourette – Vocals (2004–2009, 2015–present) 
Dirk Tourette – Rhythm Guitar, Vocals (2004–2009, 2015–present)
Tommy Brunette – Bass Guitar, Vocals (2004–2009, 2015–present)
Rev (Lead guitar, Vocals) (2004–2007, 2019–present)
Snell (Drums) (2004–2007, 2019–present)
Rocco (Drums) (2013–2018)
Stevie (Guitar) (2013–2018)

Discography

Albums
Blood, Sweat and Towers, June 2006, TVT Records
Fizzy Pop, October 2008, Vibrant Records
Yet To Be - EP, June 2022, Big Shades Productions

Singles

References

External links
Towers of London at MySpace.com
[ Biography] at AllMusic
 
Towers of London lose two band members
F**K IT UP! Towers of London documentary

English punk rock groups
Glam punk groups
Musical groups established in 2004
Musical groups from Buckinghamshire
TVT Records artists